Sai Ying Pun is an area in Western District, on Hong Kong Island, in Hong Kong. It is administratively part of the Central and Western District.

Etymology
In Cantonese, Sai means "west" and Ying Pun means "camp", especially a military camp. It was where the early British military stayed.

Location
Sai Ying Pun is built on the steeply sloping lower slopes of Victoria Peak and also on the western reclamation. The areas of Shek Tong Tsui and Kennedy Town are located to the west, Sheung Wan and Tai Ping Shan are to the east, and the Mid-Levels is higher up the hill to the south. Victoria Harbour is to the north.

While the boundaries are not de jure drawn, they are nevertheless de facto defined by Whitty Street in the west and Tung Wah Hospital in the east. The HKU MTR station exit B1 straddles the boundary between Shek Tong Tsui and Sai Ying Pun. Good Luck Mansion and The Kadoorie Biological Sciences Building are in Shek Tong Tsui, while Saint Anthony's Church, Pao Siu Loong Building, and the Main Building are in Sai Ying Pun.

The eastern boundary is blurry. Lok Sin Tong Leung Kau Kui College is in Sai Ying Pun while Tung Wah Hospital is in Sheung Wan. The section of Queens Road West from Medal Court to Hollywood Road marks part of the boundary. Elsewhere, the location of the border is unknown. On a map, Sai Ying Pun can be distinguished from Sheung Wan because it is left of the street grid of the Tai Ping Shan neighborhood.

Geology
Sai Ying Pun is built on top of Hong Kong granite. The granite was formed in the Upper Jurassic Period and is from the last phase of intrusions in the Hong Kong area. The granite is found over most of the north and centre of Hong Kong Island, and also Kowloon. The flat parts of Sai Ying Pun near the harbour are reclaimed land, built from landfill.

History

Queen's Road was the first road built in the area. It meandered around the camp structures and extended along the north coast of Hong Kong Island.

Sai Ying Pun was settled as Chinese immigrants moved into Hong Kong and built to the west of Tai Ping Shan. Europeans were assigned areas above High Street where Chinese were excluded from living.

In the early 1880s, sewerage was installed into the area, with the main flow coming down Centre Street. Streets were also macadamised or concreted at this time.

Around 1882, Battery Road was renamed Bonham Road.

From 1884 to 1887, many brothels were declared by the Government to be unlicensed and closed down. These were mainly in First, Second and Third Street, but also in Sheung Fung Lane, Ui On Lane and Centre Street.

In 1894, an epidemic of bubonic plague struck and afflicted Sai Ying Pun residents. It was not initially as bad as in neighbouring Tai Ping Shan, which was abandoned and demolished to improve hygiene. However, Sheung Fung Lane residents were almost wiped out. Government reports called this area the number IX health district and went into great detail about the buildings where the disease occurred. In 1896, there were 115 cases, in 1898, 153 cases, in 1899, 263 cases, in 1900 98 cases, in 1904 there were 149 cases with 144 dying, and 55 cases in 1905. The great majority of infections in this district resulted in death.

In 1902, number 10 and 12 Second Street partially collapsed killing four people and injuring six. An additional storey had been added to number 10 at the beginning of 1901. It fell on number 12 and caused it to collapse as well. The extension had been designed by architects Denison and Ram. Also in 1902, a cookhouse at 56 First Street collapsed, one person was killed.

In 1899, there were 1017 houses and a population estimate of 24,800. Most houses in Des Voeux Road and First Street were three stories, and in Second and Third Street they were two stories. In 1904 population was 24,900 and average occupancy per floor of each house was 8.9. In 1905, the population was 25083.

In 1903, most houses were made from soft blue bricks, they had basements, and retaining walls at the front and back due to the steep slope.

In the early 1900s, there was a Berlin Foundling House in High Street, a Sailors Home, and a Lunatic Asylum.

Main streets

Bonham Road
Centre Street
Connaught Road West
Des Voeux Road West
Eastern Street
First Street
High Street
Pok Fu Lam Road
Queen's Road West
Second Street
Third Street
Western Street
Whitty Street

Minor lanes
There are many small lanes in Sai Ying Pun, mostly open only to pedestrians. They had more importance in historical times when they were used to access many houses. Now they are mainly cross connects and back alleys. Some lanes are private, and some may have disappeared. The interest nowadays is in their names, as very few places now have addresses in them.

Algar Lane
Cheung On Lane
Chung Ching Street
David Lane
Fuk Luk Lane
Fuk On Lane
Fuk Sau Lane
Fuk Shing Lane
Fuk Ching lane
Heung Hing Lane
Ki Ling Lane
Kung Shu Lane
Kwok Hing Lane
Lau U Lane
Leung I Fong
On Wai Lane
Praya West – renamed to Connaught Road when reclamation moved the shoreline of the harbour.
Rienacker Street
Sai Yuen Lane
Sheung Fung Lane
Sheung Hing Lane and Alley
Tak Sing Lane
Torsien Street
Tuck Wa Lane
Ui On Lane
Un Fuk Lane
Un Shing Lane
Wai On Lane
Water Street
Yu Lok Lane – contains the oldest existing houses in the suburb

Public facilities

 Western District Community Centre (built 1922 as Tsan Yuk Hospital)
 King George V Memorial Park, Hong Kong
 Prince Philip Dental Hospital
 Sun Yat Sen Memorial Park
 Sai Ying Pun Community Complex
 Sai Ying Pun Market
 Second Street Public Bathhouse (built 1925)
 Western Magistracy (built 1953)

Education

Primary schools
Kau Yan School
Bonham Road Government Primary School
St Clare's Primary School
Li Sing Primary School (李陞小學)

Kennedy Town is in Primary One Admission (POA) School Net 11. Within the school net are multiple aided schools (operated independently but funded with government money) and Bonham Road and Li Sing government primary schools.

Li Sing Primary originated from the attached primary school of Northcote College of Education. Li Sing Primary is named after Li Sing, one of the co-founders of Tung Wah Group of Hospitals, and the father of Li Po-chun (李寶椿), who decided to fund the school because it carried his father's name. Li Po-chun gave $250,000 Hong Kong dollars towards the school's construction. Leigh & Orange built the school, which opened in February 1955. The Governor of Hong Kong formally opening the facility. Originally the school had 12 schools and special vocational facilities. It became a site for adult education in the evenings, catering to adults with no secondary education diplomas, on 18 October 1955. This was the first such adult education centre in Hong Kong. It is on the Sai Ying Pun Heritage Trail (西營盤歷史文化徑). 

Secondary schools
King's College
Lok Sin Tong Leung Kau Kui College
St. Louis School, Hong Kong
St. Paul's College, Hong Kong
St. Stephen's Church College
St. Stephen's Girls' College

University
University of Hong Kong

Historical buildings
Grade 1
Façade of Old Mental Hospital (Sai Ying Pun Community Complex)
Old Tsan Yuk Maternity Hospital - Main Building
Tsung Tsin Mission of Hong Kong Kau Yan Church
King's College

Grade 2
No. 207 Des Voeux Road West- a four-storey shop house
Old Lunatic Asylum Chinese Block - Main Building & Staff Quarters
Old Tsan Yuk Maternity Hospital - Annex Block
St. Louis School, Hong Kong - East Wing

Grade 3
Tsung Tsin Mission of Hong Kong Kau Yan Church
No. 19 Hing Hon Road
Old Upper Levels Police Station
Nos. 9 and 10 Yu Lok Lane

Transportation

Sai Ying Pun station, which is one of the MTR stations and part of Hong Kong Island line, started servicing the area on 29 March 2015. Trams run along Des Voeux Road West, taking passengers to the east or west of Hong Kong Island.

Many bus routes run along Des Voeux Road and Queen's Road West, with some routes routed through the lower parts of Water Street and Pok Fu Lam Road. Most streets are too steep or narrow for buses, however green minibuses and some red minibus routes travel through the upper streets.

Taxis frequent First, Second and Third Streets.

A series of escalators can take pedestrians up Centre Street, from Second Street to Bonham Road via the Sai Ying Pun Market.

The Western Harbour Crossing tunnel goes from Sai Ying Pun under Victoria Harbour to West Kowloon, and is a popular route for cars, trucks and buses.

References

 Geological Map of Hong Kong 1979
 Hong Kong Government Reports Online from Hong Kong University

External links
 

 
Central and Western District, Hong Kong
Populated coastal places in Hong Kong
Sai Wan
Victoria City